= Yaradal =

- Village
- Country: India
- State: Karnataka
- District: Belgaum
- Named for: yaradal

Government
  - Type: karanataka

Languages
  - Official: Kannada
- Time zone: UTC+5:30 (IST)
- 591102: 591102

Yaradal is a village in Belgaum district in the southern state of Karnataka, India.
